Bakit Labis Kitang Mahal is a 1992 Filipino romantic drama film written and directed by Jose Javier Reyes. The film stars Lea Salonga, Aga Muhlach, and Ariel Rivera. Produced by OctoArts Films, Bakit Labis Kitang Mahal was released on December 25, 1992.

The film received 5 nominations and 4 wins at the 1992 Metro Manila Film Festival and 2 nominations at the 1993 Gawad Urian Awards.

Plot 
Sandy (Lea Salonga) returns to the Philippines from the United States to see her family and fiancé, David (Ariel Rivera). David's friend Tommy Carbonel (Aga Muhlach), who is unhappy with his relationship with his girlfriend, Cynthia (Chin-Chin Gutierrez), resigns from his job in the hotel lobby. David introduces Sandy to Tommy before leaving to help plan the upcoming wedding. After David departs, an unexpected romance ensues between Sandy and Tommy.

Cast

Main cast 

 Lea Salonga as Sandy
 Aga Muhlach as Tommy Carbonel
 Ariel Rivera as David

Supporting cast 

 Sandy Andolong as Marita
 Bimbo Bautista as Benjie
 Manny Castañeda as Didoy
 Eric Cayetano as Ronnie
 Chin-Chin Gutierrez (credited as Maria Jose "Michelle" Arnaldo) as Cynthia
 Barbara Perez as Cita
 Noel Trinidad as Arturo
 Mary Walter as Lola Guelay
 Gloria Romero

References

External links 

 Bakit Labis Kitang Mahal at IMDb

1992 films
Filipino-language films
Films set in the Philippines
Philippine romance films
Philippine drama films
Philippine romantic drama films